Winton Place is a 264-foot high-rise residential building in Lakewood, Ohio. It was named after automobile magnate Alexander Winton, who built a house for his family on the same land that the building occupies today. Designed by Cleveland engineering firm Arthur G. McKee Co. under the direction of engineering supervisor Karlis Maizitis and completed in 1963, it was the tallest apartment building between New York City and Chicago. Winton Place is one of the most exclusive and one of the highest views in an apartment in Greater Cleveland. Its construction cost $20 million ($ today).

See also
 Lakewood Gold Coast

References

Residential skyscrapers in Cleveland
Apartment buildings in Cleveland